Neosticta canescens is a species of damselfly in the family Isostictidae,
commonly known as a southern pinfly. 
It can be found in eastern Australia, where it inhabits streams.

Neosticta canescens is a medium-sized damselfly, dull brown to black in colour with pale markings.

Gallery

See also
 List of Odonata species of Australia

References 

Isostictidae
Odonata of Australia
Insects of Australia
Endemic fauna of Australia
Taxa named by Robert John Tillyard
Insects described in 1913
Damselflies